Paton is a surname of Scottish origin. It was formed by adding an Old French suffix -on to the given name Pat, a short version of Patrick. Notable people with the surname include:

Al Paton, musician from South Africa and Namibia
Alan Paton (1903–1988), South African author and anti-apartheid activist
Alex Paton, Scottish footballer
Andrew Archibald Paton (1811–1874), British diplomat, orientalist, and author
Andy Paton (1923–2014), Scottish football player and manager
Angela Paton (1930–2016), theatre, TV and film actress
Angus Paton (1905–1999), British civil engineer from Jersey
Ann Paton, Lady Paton, PC (born 1952), Scottish advocate and judge
Bartolome Jimenez Paton (1569–1640), Spanish humanist, rhetorician, grammarian and writer
Bert Paton (born 1942), Scottish football player and manager
Borys Paton (1918–2020), chairman of the National Academy of Sciences of Ukraine
Charles Paton (1874–1970), English film actor
Charlie Paton, Scottish polar adventurer
Daniel Paton (born 1871), Scottish footballer
Danny Paton (born 1936), Scottish footballer
David Paton (disambiguation), multiple people 
David Paton (born 1949), Scottish musician
David Paton (architect) (1801–1882), Scottish architect and builder
David Paton (artist), Scottish artist active between 1660–1700
David Paton (doctor) (1912–2008), medical officer on St Nazaire raid of World War II
David Paton (ophthalmologist) (born 1930), founder of Project Orbis
Diarmid Noel Paton, FRS FRSE (1859–1928), Scottish physician and academic
Elizabeth Paton (1760–1799), later Elizabeth Andrew of Lairgieside
Eric Paton (born 1978), Scottish professional footballer
Eris Paton (1928–2004), New Zealand cricketer
Ernest Forrester Paton (1891–1970), Scottish medical missionary to Pune, Bombay
Evgeny Paton (1870–1953), Ukrainian engineer
Florence Paton (1891–1976), British Labour Party MP
Frank Paton (1855–1909), English artist of the Victorian and Edwardian eras
Gavin Paton, Army Sergeant Major of the British Army
George Paton (disambiguation), multiple people 
George Henry Tatham Paton (1895–1917), Scottish recipient of the Victoria Cross
George Paton (cricketer) (1879–1950), Australian cricketer
George Paton (footballer), Scottish football player during the 1940s and 1950s
George Whitecross Paton (1902–1985), vice chancellor of Melbourne University
Graeme Paton, British journalist, and Transport Correspondent for The Times
Harry Paton (rugby union) (1881–1964), New Zealand rugby player, administrator and referee
Herbert James Paton (1887–1969), Scottish philosopher
Hugh Paton (1852–1941), Scottish business owner in Montreal
Ian Paton (disambiguation), multiple people 
Ian Paton (footballer) (born 1957), Australian rules footballer
Ian Paton (politician), Canadian politician
Ian Paton (bishop) (born 1957), Anglican bishop
James Paton (disambiguation), multiple people 
James Alexander Paton (1884–1946), newspaper owner and political figure in British Columbia
James Paton (bishop) (1522–1596), 16th-century Scottish cleric from Ballilisk, Kinross
James Paton (mayor) (1853–1953), Scots-born merchant in Prince Edward Island, Canada
James Paton (seaman) (1869–1917), Scots-born Antarctic expeditioner
James Paton (sport shooter) (born 1957), sport shooter from Canada
Jamie Paton, Australian international football player
Jean Paton (born 1929), British bryologist
Joan Paton (1916–2000), Australian ornithologist
Joe Paton (1878–1952), Australian rules footballer
John Paton (disambiguation), multiple people 
John Paton (British politician) (1886–1976), Labour MP for Norwich
John Paton (general) CB, CMG (1867–1943), Australian general in World War I
John Paton (VC) (1833–1914), Scottish recipient of the Victoria Cross
John Brown Paton (1830–1911), English theologian
John Gibson Paton (1824–1907), Scottish missionary to Vanuatu
Johnny Paton (1923–2015), Scottish professional football player, manager, coach
Jonathan Paton (born 1971), politician and intelligence officer in the U.S. Army Reserve in Iraq
Joseph Noel Paton (1821–1901), Scottish artist
Lewis B. Paton (1864–1932), American biblical scholar
Mary Ann Paton (1802–1864), Scottish vocalist
Mary Paton, founder of Australian Breastfeeding Association
Michael Paton (disambiguation), multiple people 
Michael Paton (born 1989), Scottish professional footballer
Michael Paton (Dumbarton footballer), Scottish footballer of the 1880s
Michael Paton (priest), Anglican priest and author in the 20th century
Norman Paton, Professor in the School of Computer Science at the University of Manchester
Paul Paton (born 1987), professional footballer
Raffaëla Paton (born 1983), Dutch singer
Richard Paton (1717–1791), British marine painter
Robert Paton (disambiguation), multiple people 
Robert Paton (chemist), Harrison-Meldola Memorial Prize winner
Robert Paton (footballer) (1854–1905), Scottish footballer
Robert Paton (politician) (1839–1917), Ontario farmer, merchant and political figure
Robert Thomson Paton (1856–1929), Australian public health official
Roy Paton (1882–1947), Australian politician
Sarah Paton (born 1986), Australian long-distance swimmer
Siobhan Paton, OAM (born 1983), Australian Paralympic swimmer
Stewart Paton (1865–1942), American psychiatrist
Stuart Paton (1883–1944), British director, screenwriter and actor of the silent era
Taine Paton (born 1989), South African field hockey player
Tam Paton (1938–2009), Scottish manager of the Bay City Rollers
Tom Paton (ice hockey) (1854–1909), Canadian ice hockey player
Wade Paton (born 1986), South African field hockey player
Waller Hugh Paton RSA RSW (1828–1895), Scottish landscape artist
Walter Paton (1853–1937), English barrister who wrote guides to emigration to the British colonies
William Paton (disambiguation), multiple people 
William Andrew Paton (1889–1991), American accountancy scholar
William D. M. Paton FRS (1917–1993), British pharmacologist
William J. Paton (died 2002), Scottish footballer
William Roger Paton (1857–1921), author and translator of ancient Greek texts and poets
Willie Paton (1925–2005), Scottish footballer

References

See also
Paton (disambiguation)
Paton (given name)
Paton (motorcycles), an Italian motorcycle manufacturer
Patons and Baldwins, a former British manufacturer of knitting yarn
Patton (disambiguation)

Scottish surnames